Claude "Didi" Andrey (born 13 June 1951 in Genève, Switzerland) is a former Swiss footballer, who most recently managed Yverdon-Sport FC in the Challenge League.

Andrey took over FC Basel for  their 1993–94 season. His team included the likes of Swiss international goalkeeper Stefan Huber, defenders Massimo Ceccaroni, Marco Walker, Reto Baumgartner and Samir Tabakovic, the midfielders Mario Cantaluppi, Martin Jeitziner, Admir Smajić and Ørjan Berg and the Swiss international strikers Dario Zuffi and Philippe Hertig. Together they won the promotion/relegation group and became Nationalliga B champions and thus won promotion to the top flight of Swiss football. This after six seasons in the second tier.

He stayed with the club the next season, but was fired during the starting months of his third season.

References

External links
Swiss players in France, RSSSF

1951 births
Living people
Swiss men's footballers
Switzerland international footballers
Swiss Super League players
Grasshopper Club Zürich players
Neuchâtel Xamax FCS players
Servette FC players
Ligue 2 players
Grenoble Foot 38 players
FC Sion players
Ligue 1 players
FC Mulhouse players
FC Lausanne-Sport players
Swiss football managers
FC Sion managers
FC Basel managers
Étoile Carouge FC players
FC Chiasso managers
Apollon Pontou FC managers
Expatriate football managers in the Republic of the Congo
Congo national football team managers
Espérance Sportive de Tunis managers
Expatriate football managers in Tunisia
Expatriate football managers in Greece
Expatriate football managers in Cameroon
Association football midfielders
Swiss expatriate sportspeople in Greece
Swiss expatriate sportspeople in France
Swiss expatriate sportspeople in Cameroon
Swiss expatriate sportspeople in the Republic of the Congo
Footballers from Geneva